This is a list of women who explored or travelled the world in a pioneering way. The list may include women naturalists, sailors, mountain climbers, dog sledders, swimmers, pilots, and underwater explorers. Astronauts are not included here but in the list of female astronauts. The list is presented in alphabetical order of surname, but can be sorted to other orders (nationality, dates) by using the arrow-heads in the column headers.

See also

 Age of Discovery
 Exploration
 List of Antarctic women
 List of explorations
 List of explorers
 List of female astronauts
 List of lost expeditions
 List of travelers
 Women in space

References

 
 
explorers